The 1995 FIVB Women's World Cup was held from 3 to 17 November 1995 in Japan. Twelve national teams played in cities all over Japan for the right to a fast lane ticket into the 1996 Summer Olympics in Atlanta, US.

Teams

  — Host
  — African Champions
  — Asian Champions
  — European Champions
  — NORCECA Champions
  — South American Champions

  — Asian Vice-champions
  — European Vice-champions
  — NORCECA Vice-champions
  — South American Vice-champions
  — Wild-card
  — Wild-card

Squads

Results

|}

First round

Site A
Location: Tokyo

|}

Site B
Location: Matsumoto

|}

Second round

Site A
Location: Fukuoka

|}

Site B
Location: Fukui

|}

Third round

Site A
Location: Nagoya

|}

Site B
Location: Okazaki

|}

Fourth round

Site A
Location: Osaka

|}

Site B
Location: Kobe

|}

Final standing

Awards

 Most Valuable Player
 
 Best Scorer
 
 Best Spiker
 
 Best Server
 

 Best Blocker
 
 Best Digger
 
 Best Setter
 
 Best Receiver

External links
 Results
 Player Statistics
 Attack, Block, Serve
 Dig, Set, Reception

1995 Women's
Women's World Cup
V
V
FIVB Volleyball
Women's volleyball in Japan